A bowling ball is a hard spherical object used in the sport of bowling.

Bowling ball may also refer to:

 Bowling ball, a card in the game of Bowling (solitaire)
 "Bowling Balls", a song by Insane Clown Posse from the 2004 album Hell's Pit, and an associated short film

See also
 Bowling Ball Beach, a beach in Mendocino County, California.
 "Human bowling ball", nickname of American Footballer Charlie Tolar
 "MTV Rock N' Jock Bowling Ball", a 1999 episode on the MTV television series MTV Rock N' Jock